Henricus Boelen II (May 5, 1697 - August 27, 1755) was a noted American silversmith active in New York City.

Boelen was born in New York City, the son and apprentice of Dutch immigrant silversmith, Jacob Boelen I, who willed his business to Henricus in 1729. He became a freeman in 1718, married Jannetje Waldron on June 19, 1718, and served as master to his own son, Jacob Boelen II, around 1746. Boelen's pieces are collected in major museums, including the Brooklyn Museum, Yale University museum, and Winterthur Museum.

References 
 American silver at Winterthur, Ian M. G. Quimby, Dianne Johnson, Henry Francis du Pont Winterthur Museum, 1995, page 196.
 American Silver of the XVII & XVIII Centuries: A Study Based on the Clearwater Collection, Alphonso Trumpbour Clearwater, Clara Louise Avery, Metropolitan Museum of Art, 1920, page xxxix. 
 Remembrance of Patria: Dutch Arts and Culture in Colonial America, 1609-1776, Roderic H. Blackburn, Ruth Piwonka, SUNY Press, 1988, page 278.
 Ancestry.com entry

1697 births
1755 deaths
American silversmiths
Artists from New York City